John Major Henniker-Major, 5th Baron Henniker VD DL (7 November 1842 – 27 June 1902), was a British peer and Conservative politician.

Background and education
Henniker was the son of John Henniker-Major, 4th Baron Henniker, and was educated at Eton and Trinity College, Cambridge,

Political career

Henniker was elected MP for East Suffolk in 1866, succeeding his father. He held the seat until 1870, when he succeeded his father as fifth Baron Henniker and second Baron Hartismere. The latter title had been granted to his father in 1866, and gave him a seat in the House of Lords (in contrast to the barony of Henniker which was in the Peerage of Ireland). In 1877 Henniker was appointed a Lord-in-waiting (government whip in the House of Lords) in the Conservative government of Benjamin Disraeli, a post he held until the government fell in 1880, and again under Lord Salisbury between 1885 and 1886, between 1886 and 1892, and briefly in 1895. He was appointed Lieutenant Governor of the Isle of Man in 1895, serving as such until his death in 1902.

Lord Henniker was for many years chairman of the quarter sessions and of the county council for East Suffolk. He was an Honorary Colonel of the 6th Volunteer Battalion of the Suffolk Regiment, and received the Volunteer Officers' Decoration.

Family
Lord Henniker married, in 1864, Lady Alice Mary Cuffe (d.1893), daughter of John Cuffe, 3rd Earl of Desart. They had twelve children, including:
 Hon. Alice Margaret Mary Henniker-Major (1870–1923), a soprano singer; m. in 1902 the conductor Julian Seymour Clifford (1877–1921), and left children.
 Charles Henniker-Major, 6th Baron Henniker (1872–1956)
 Hon. Gerald Arthur George Henniker-Major (b.1872)
 Hon. Ethel Elizabeth Emily Henniker-Major (b.1874)
 Hon. Victor Alexander Henniker-Major (b.1878)
 Hon. Lilian Bertha Aline Henniker-Major (b.1880)
 John Ernest de Grey Henniker-Major (1883–1980), a Page of Honour to Queen Victoria 1895–99, later 7th Baron Henniker; who left issue including successive barons.
 Hon. Dorothy Florence Stella Henniker-Major (b.1885)

He died at Government House, Isle of Man, on 27 June 1902, aged 59, and was succeeded in his titles by his eldest surviving son, Charles. A state funeral service was held at St. George's Church, Douglas, on 29 June 1902, and his remains were interred at the family burial ground in Thornham, Suffolk, three days later.

See also
Parliament of the United Kingdom
Politics of the United Kingdom

References

External links 
 

Henniker, John Henniker-Major, 5th Baron
Henniker, John Henniker-Major, 5th Baron
Henniker, John Henniker-Major, 5th Baron
Conservative Party (UK) MPs for English constituencies
UK MPs 1865–1868
UK MPs 1868–1874
UK MPs who inherited peerages
People educated at Eton College
Alumni of Trinity College, Cambridge
Deputy Lieutenants of Norfolk
Suffolk Regiment officers
Lieutenant Governors of the Isle of Man
Eldest sons of British hereditary barons
Barons Henniker